Sloan Siegrist (born 24 September 1980) is an American-Guamanian middle-distance runner. She competed in the women's 1500 metres at the 2004 Summer Olympics.

References

External links
 

1980 births
Living people
American female middle-distance runners
Guamanian female middle-distance runners
Athletes (track and field) at the 2004 Summer Olympics
Olympic track and field athletes of Guam
Place of birth missing (living people)
21st-century American women